Lectionary 280, designated by siglum ℓ 280 (in the Gregory-Aland numbering) is a Greek manuscript of the New Testament, on parchment. Palaeographically it has been assigned to the 14th century.
Scrivener labelled it as 185e.

The manuscript has complex contents.

Description 

The codex contains lessons from the Gospel of John, Matthew, and Luke (Evangelistarium).

The text is written in Greek minuscule letters, on 240 parchment leaves, in two columns per page, 28 lines per page. The manuscript contains weekday Gospel lessons.

The manuscript is bound in red velvet, and according to Scrivener in excellent preservation.

It contains text of the pericope John 8:3-11.

History 

Scrivener dated the manuscript to the 14th century, and Gregory to the 12th century. It has been assigned by the Institute for New Testament Textual Research to the 14th century.

The manuscript was written in Constantinople. The name of scribe was Nikolaos.

The manuscript was added to the list of New Testament manuscripts by Scrivener (number 185e) and Gregory (number 280e). Gregory saw the manuscript in 1886.

The manuscript is not cited in the critical editions of the Greek New Testament (UBS3).

The codex is housed at the Istituto Ellenico di Studi Bizantini e Postbizantini (G') in Venice.

See also 

 List of New Testament lectionaries
 Biblical manuscript
 Textual criticism
 Lectionary 279

Notes and references

Bibliography 

 

Greek New Testament lectionaries
14th-century biblical manuscripts